Nilamba  may refer to:
Nilamba people, an ethnic and linguistic group based in the Shinyanga Region, Tanzania
Nilamba language, a Bantu language spoken in the Shinyanga Region, Tanzania